Fred Sutcliffe (29 May 1931 – 10 February 1972) was an English footballer who played as an inside left or wing half in the Football League for Chester. He was on the books of Birmingham City without playing for their first team, and went on to play non-league football for Northwich Victoria (two spells) and Winsford United.

Sutcliffe died in Chester on 10 February 1972, at the age of 40.

References

1931 births
1972 deaths
People from Selby District
English footballers
Association football inside forwards
Association football wing halves
Birmingham City F.C. players
Chester City F.C. players
Northwich Victoria F.C. players
Winsford United F.C. players
English Football League players